Jemerson de Jesus Nascimento (born 24 August 1992), known simply as Jemerson, is a Brazilian professional footballer who plays as a centre-back for Atlético Mineiro.

Club career 
Born in Jeremoabo, Bahia, Jemerson only played as an amateur until 2009, signing for Confiança. He joined Atlético Mineiro's youth setup in the following year, after failed trials at Palmeiras, Santos and Vasco.

Atlético Mineiro 
Jemerson made his senior debut in 2012, while on loan at Democrata, appearing in 12 matches. He subsequently returned to Galo in August and was promoted to the senior squad on a permanent basis in December.

Jemerson made his first team – and Série A – debut on 7 July 2013, starting and being booked in a 3–2 home win against Criciúma. A backup to Leonardo Silva and Réver, he only appeared in five matches during the campaign.

In 2014, Jemerson profited from Réver's serious ankle injury, and was a starter for the majority of the year.

Monaco 
On 31 January 2016, Jemerson signed for Ligue 1 club Monaco on a five-year contract. He was a starter during the 2016–17 campaign, in which the team won the league and reached the semifinals of the UEFA Champions League. He left the club after terminating his contract on 2 November 2020.

Corinthians 
On 5 November 2020, Jemerson returned to Brazil as he signed with Corinthians on an eight-month transfer.

Metz 
On 8 October 2021, Jemerson signed for Ligue 1 side FC Metz until the end of the season. On 29 April 2022, his contract with Metz was terminated by mutual consent.

Return to Atlético Mineiro 
On 20 June 2022, Atlético Mineiro announced the return of Jemerson to the club.

International career 
Jemerson received his first international call-up for a 2018 FIFA World Cup qualification match against Peru on 17 November 2015.

He made his debut for the national team in a June 2017 friendly away against Australia, which Brazil won 4–0.

Career statistics

Club

International

Honours

Club 
Atlético Mineiro
 Copa Libertadores: 2013
 Recopa Sudamericana: 2014
 Copa do Brasil: 2014
 Campeonato Mineiro: 2013, 2015

Monaco
 Ligue 1: 2016–17

Individual 
 Campeonato Brasileiro Série A Team of the Year: 2015

References

External links 
 Atlético Mineiro profile 
 
 

1992 births
Living people
Sportspeople from Bahia
Brazilian footballers
Brazil international footballers
Association football defenders
Clube Atlético Mineiro players
AS Monaco FC players
FC Metz players
Sport Club Corinthians Paulista players
Campeonato Brasileiro Série A players
Ligue 1 players
Championnat National 2 players
Brazilian expatriate footballers
Brazilian expatriate sportspeople in France
Brazilian expatriate sportspeople in Monaco
Expatriate footballers in France
Expatriate footballers in Monaco